Hammer Hill is a summit in Alberta, Canada.

Hammer Hill was named from an incident when an Indian was killed with a hammer during a domestic dispute.

References

Hills of Alberta